Goal 3 may refer to:
 Goal III: Taking on the World, a 2009 film
 Sustainable Development Goal 3, a goal established by the United Nations in 2015